Dale Wright may refer to:

 Dale Wright (singer) (1938–2007), American rock & roll singer
 Dale Wright (politician) (born 1950/51),  member of the Missouri House of Representatives
 Dale S. Wright, professor of religion

See also
 Dale Wright Award